A spoken language is a language produced by articulate sounds or (depending on one's definition) manual gestures, as opposed to a written language. An oral language or vocal language is a language produced with the vocal tract in contrast with a sign language, which is produced with the body and hands.

Definition
The term "spoken language" is sometimes used to mean only oral languages, especially by linguists, excluding sign languages and making the terms 'spoken', 'oral', 'vocal language' synonymous. Others refer to sign language as "spoken", especially in contrast to written transcriptions of signs.

Context
In spoken language, much of a speaker's meaning is determined by the context. That contrasts with written language in which more of the meaning is provided directly by the text. In spoken language, the truth of a proposition is determined by common-sense reference to experience, but in written language, a greater emphasis is placed on logical and coherent argument. Similarly, the spoken language tends to convey subjective information, including the relationship between the speaker and the audience. (Conversation, in formal or informal settings is an example.) Written language, on the other hand, is the common mode used to convey objective information.

Both vocal and sign languages are composed of words. In vocal languages, words are made up from a limited set of vowels and consonants, and often tone. In sign languages, words are made up from a limited set of shapes, orientations, locations movements of the hands, and often facial expressions; in both cases, the building blocks are called phonemes. In both vocal and sign languages, words are grammatically and prosodically linked into phrases, clauses, and larger units of discourse.

Relation between spoken and written language
The relationship between spoken language and written language is complex. Within the fields of linguistics, the current consensus is that speech is an innate human capability, and written language is a cultural invention. However, some linguists, such as those of the Prague school, argue that written and spoken language possess distinct qualities which would argue against written language being dependent on spoken language for its existence.

Acquiring spoken language
Hearing children acquire as their first language the language that is used around them, whether vocal, cued (if they are sighted), or signed. Deaf children can do the same with Cued Speech or sign language if either visual communication system is used around them. Vocal language are traditionally taught to them in the same way that written language must be taught to hearing children. (See oralism.) Teachers give particular emphasis on spoken language with children who speak a different primary language outside of the school. For the child it is considered important, socially and educationally, to have the opportunity to understand multiple languages.

See also

References

Speech
Language varieties and styles